The North Carolina Azalea Festival is an annual community festival in Wilmington, North Carolina. The largest festival of its kind in the state, it was founded in 1948, and takes place in April.

History
The Azalea Festival began in 1948 as an idea of Dr. W. Houston Moore, M.D. Dr. Moore held a meeting in Wilmington's Chamber of Commerce with civil club representatives to discuss and begin planning for the first Azalea Festival. The Festival would take place in April 1948 and would serve the purpose of showcasing the local gardens such as Airlie Gardens, Orton Gardens, and Greenfield Gardens.

The following is a letter written by Mr. Morton to Gayle Ward in response to her request for information about the Festival beginnings:

A number of events have made up the Azalea Festival schedule, including the Azalea Open Invitational where Arnold Palmer took home the title in 1957.

The first sidewalk show was held in 1953 and has continued as tradition since.

The 2020 festival was cancelled in response to the coronavirus pandemic.

Customs and traditions

Airlie Gardens 
Airlie Gardens span  of Wilmington property and was created in 1901. The gardens are less than a mile from the ocean and planted with various types of flora. Ownership of the gardens has changed hands several times and has gone from being a  land grant from King George II in 1735 to a now comparably smaller  garden open for public viewing. 
Garden tours are open to the public and include visits to several different areas of Airlie including the butterfly garden, a mystery grave, and the Minnie Evans Sculpture Garden. The latter has a "BottleChapel" along with both metal and ceramic sculptures. Airlie Gardens also hosts summer camps and educational programs are available to the public.

Cape Fear Garden Club Azalea Belles
A tradition held by the Azalea Festival is the "Belles": young ladies who serve as hostesses and guides to the gardens in the area. This tradition began in 1969 under a suggestion by the president of the Cape Fear Garden Club at that time. The first year, seven girls played the role of Azalea Belles. 
To become an Azalea Belle, one must apply for the position; however, precedence is given to those girls who are either daughters or granddaughters of Cape Fear Garden Club members. Girls from New Hanover County High School are next to be a NC Azalea Belle. If the Belle is not a member of the Cape Fear Garden Club, she may be "committee sponsored" by applying through the belle chairman. 
New Azalea Belle policies were adopted in 2006. The number of belles needed for each year is dependent upon the size of the gardens in the tour and is determined by the belle chairman. Also, a young lady may only serve as a Belle one year and may not be in the Azalea Festival Scholarship Pageant during the year that she serves as a belle.
As of August 2020, "Belles" are no longer affiliated with the North Carolina Azalea Festival.

North Carolina Azalea Festival Queens

The North Carolina Azalea Festival has brought a number of people to the Wilmington area to serve as the Festival's Queen. Queens are crowned during the first day of the festival. Past participants include:

Celebrities 
Celebrities who have visited the southern town of Wilmington for the festival (including as guests, visitors, Queens, and emcees to the Festival) have included:

Notes and references

Festivals in North Carolina
Tourist attractions in New Hanover County, North Carolina
Wilmington, North Carolina
Debutante balls
Flower festivals in the United States
Balls in the United States
Annual events in North Carolina